40 Days for Life is an international organization that campaigns against abortion in more than 60 nations worldwide. It was originally started in 2004 by members of the Brazos Valley Coalition for Life in Texas. The name refers to a repeated pattern of events lasting for 40 days in the Bible, such as Noah’s Ark, Moses’s 40 days on Mount Sinai, and Jesus’s 40 days in the desert.

The 40 Days for Life  campaign is active in the spring during the Christian season of Lent and in the fall. Campaigns are organized simultaneously in hundreds of cities in the United States and around the world, although not all campaign locations participate every time. Each campaign consists of 40 days of prayer and fasting in shifts outside of a clinic or hospital that performs abortions or which is an abortion referral center. The campaign also involves outreach to the community to promote awareness about abortion and outreach directly to women considering abortion. Participants are required to sign a “Statement of Peace” stating that they will act lawfully and peacefully while participating in the campaign.

History
According to the Diocese of Sioux City, the initial 2004 local campaign was begun in reaction to the presence of a Planned Parenthood abortion facility which had opened in Bryan, Texas in 1998. ProLife 365 says that four members of the Brazos Valley Coalition for Life decided to start the prayer campaign 24 hours a day for 40 days with the goal of closing the facility, and credits this campaign for a rejuvenation of local anti-abortion activities in the Bryan-College Station area.

According to The Zenit Project, in early 2007, the original 40 Days for Life leaders suggested a simultaneous nationwide 40 Days for Life campaign in as many cities as wished to participate. According to Catholic Exchange, the first national campaign ran that fall with vigils in 89 cities in 33 U.S. states. A second national campaign was added to run during the spring of each year, starting in Lent of 2008 with campaigns in 59 cities. 

According to the Christian Post, the spring 2009 campaign had numerous U.S. and international cities participating, including Brisbane, Australia and cities in Canada, Northern Ireland, and the United States. 40 Days for Life also began campaigning against clinics in Ireland prior to the 2018 constitutional amendment legalizing the procedure; such clinics gave information to women who were thinking of having an abortion in Britain, where abortion is widely legal.

In 2013, the Bryan Planned Parenthood closed. The building is now operated by 40 Days for Life.

According to The Florida Catholic, as of the spring 2019 campaign, more than 1,000,000 people have participated in 61 countries across all six populated continents. Lutherans for Life says that approximately 19,000 churches have participated in the 6,428 local campaigns that have been held since 40 Days for Life began. The US-based Christian Broadcasting Network reports that more than 16,000 confirmed instances where potential patients did not have a planned abortion. Campaigns continue to be held in the spring and fall of each year.

Opposition
An American Civil Liberties Union spokesperson called 40 Days for Life "the most dangerous threat to choice".Abortion rights activists, concerned that the 40 Days for Life campaigns harass and intimidate women seeking abortions, have reacted against it with protests such as “40 Days of Choice”, among others. Abortion rights activists have pursued legal avenues such as buffer zones, especially in Canada and Europe, to prevent anti-abortion activists from approaching women or standing nearby abortion facilities.

In the United Kingdom, the 40 Days for Life campaign has been described as an "American-style" protest. Abortion rights activists say that harassment of clinic patients in the United Kingdom is increasing due to the campaign; 40 Days for Life denies that the campaign promotes harassment. The British Pregnancy Advisory Service states that some abortion appointments cancelled during a 40 Days for Life campaign or similar protest are rescheduled after the protest.

According to Holly Baxter, writing for the British publication The Guardian, the organization’s participants at vigils harass women and pregnant children trying to access sexual health or maternity clinics by singing hymns, distributing rosaries, and distributing leaflets disguised as NHS literature, which are described by a Marie Stopes representative as "pseudo-medical" and "misleading".

See also
Anti-abortion organizations in the United States
Choose Life license plates

References

External links
Official website

Anti-abortion organizations in the United States
Non-profit organizations based in Texas
Organizations established in 2007
Brazos County, Texas